The 2012 United States presidential election in Washington took place on November 6, 2012, as part of the 2012 United States presidential election in which all 50 states plus the District of Columbia participated. Washington voters chose 12 electors to represent them in the Electoral College via a popular vote pitting incumbent Democratic President Barack Obama and his running mate, Vice President Joe Biden, against Republican challenger and former Massachusetts Governor Mitt Romney and his running mate, Congressman Paul Ryan.

President Obama easily won the state of Washington, taking 56.16% of the vote to Mitt Romney's 41.29%, a 14.87% margin of victory. In terms of raw vote total, Obama received 1,755,396 votes to Romney's 1,290,670 votes, a 464,726 vote margin. Obama received the largest number of votes of any candidate up to that point, a record which would be broken by his then-running mate Joe Biden in 2020, when Biden broke Obama's record by 614,216 votes. Third parties collectively made up 79,450 votes, or 2.54%. Obama led in every single poll conducted, often by double digits. Washington has not voted for a Republican since Ronald Reagan carried it in his 1984 landslide, and today is considered part of the Blue Wall, a bloc of 242 electoral votes that have safely voted for the Democratic nominee since 1992.  Despite being a Republican-leaning swing state in the early- to mid-20th century, the rise of cultural conservatism and resistance to social liberalism in the Republican Party pushed voters in Washington, as well as many other Blue Wall states, away from the Republicans.

As with all other Pacific states, Washington politics are dominated by its progressive metropolitan areas. Washington itself is one of the most progressive states in the country, most notably on women's issues: it was one of the first states to loosen abortion restrictions and is the United States' 7th most secular state. Economically, while Washington was historically a socially liberal and economically conservative state, it has become more dominated by leftism in the past few years at the presidential, congressional, and local level. Thus, an Obama win was near guaranteed. He dominated the Seattle–Tacoma metropolitan area, winning 69.07% of the vote (a 40.56% margin) in King County, the largest in the state and home to Seattle. King County alone casts 29% of the state's ballots, and the Seattle metropolitan area (as defined by the United States Census Bureau) comprised 69.66% of the state's population in 2012. This area of the Evergreen State also has the highest minority composition with a 15% Asian, 9% Hispanic, and 7% African American population, and is dominated by diverse, well-educated voters. The Seattle LGBT community is one of the largest in the country. Thurston County, the 6th largest county in the state and home to the state capital of Olympia, gave Obama 58.27% of the vote, a 19.48% margin. The Democratic ticket also won by great margins in the counties of (in decreasing order of margin) Snohomish (Everett), Whatcom (Bellingham), Kitsap (Bremerton), and Pierce (Tacoma). Clark County, home to Vancouver, in the southwest of the state, was won by the president with a 431-vote margin. Overall, Western Washington voted 7.7% more Democratic than the state overall.

Meanwhile, Romney's best performance was in the east of the state, which is mostly rural and sparse and has an economy dominated by agriculture. Washington's geographic divide resembles that of California and Oregon: voters east of the Cascade Mountains are the most conservative in the Evergreen State, and Eastern Washington voted 28.5% more Republican than the state as a whole. While comprising most of the counties in the state, this area casts only one-fifth of the ballots. Though many of these counties the Republicans won with over 60% of the vote, these victories were not able to offset Obama's landslide margins in the Seattle–Tacoma metro. Romney's biggest prize was Spokane County, which gave him over 115,000 votes and a 5.81% margin of victory. He also won Yakima County. However, he was able to flip four counties that Obama won in 2008: Klickitat, Skamania, Wahkhiakum, and Whitman.

This election continued Clallam County's bellwether streak, marking the 9th election since 1980 that it voted for the winner of the nationwide election. Clallam's streak would eventually become the longest of any county in 2020. Washington weighed in as 11.01% more Democratic than the national average in 2012. As of 2020, this is the last presidential election in which the Republican nominee won Whitman County and the Democratic nominee won Cowlitz, Grays Harbor, Mason, and Pacific Counties. This is also the last time a Republican received more than 40% of the vote in Washington.

Caucuses

Democratic
As incumbent President Barack Obama ran without opposition nationwide, the non-binding primary was canceled by the Washington State Legislature. Precinct caucuses took place on April 15, legislative district caucuses on April 28, county conventions on April 29, and congressional district caucuses on May 30. The Washington state convection took place from June 1 to 3, and according to The Green Papers, Obama ran unopposed in the caucuses, receiving 114 delegates in the Democratic National Convention floor vote. The other 6 delegates' votes were unannounced.

Republican caucuses

The Republican caucuses were held on March 3, 2012. The additional preferential primary, as held since 1992, was canceled this year for budgetary reasons, as was the one in 2004. Caucus participants, however, did not allocate national delegates to the candidates – they only elected delegates to the county conventions and took part in a nonbinding straw poll. Only the state convention from May 31 to June 2, 2012, legally pledged delegates to the national convention to specific candidates.

Results
With 3,677,919 registered voters as of February 29, the turnout was 1.4%. Former Massachusetts Governor Mitt Romney won the caucuses with a plurality, receiving 19,111 votes or 37.65%. Ron Paul, representative from Texas's 14th district, narrowly won second place with 24.81% of the vote against former Senator from Pennsylvania Rick Santorum's 23.81%. Former Speaker of the House Newt Gingrich placed fourth, with 5,221 votes, or 10.28%. The other 3.44% of votes were uncommitted or write-ins.

Convention
At the Republican National Convention, Romney received all 3 delegates from the 1st, 2nd, 4th, 5th, 6th, 8th, 9th, and 10th districts. Ron Paul received 2 delegates from the 3rd district and all 3 from the 7th. The 3rd district also allocated 1 delegate to Rick Santorum. All 10 state delegates were allocated to Romney, as were the 3 superdelegates.

General election

Polling

President Obama consistently led in polling up until election day: at one point, a SurveyUSA poll conducted from September 28 to 30 had him leading by 20 points. In only two polls did Obama lead by single digits: a Public Policy Polling poll conducted October 15 to 16 had him leading by 5 points, and another conducted November 1 to 3 had him up 7. An average of all polls conducted before election day had Obama leading by 13.6 percentage points.

Candidate ballot access

 Barack Hussein Obama / Joseph Robinette Biden, Jr., Democratic
 Willard Mitt Romney / Paul Davis Ryan, Republican
 Gary Earl Johnson / James Polin Gray, Libertarian
 Virgil Hamlin Good, Jr. / James N. Clymer, Constitution
 Jill Ellen Stein / Cheri Lynn Honkala, Green
 Peta Lindsay / Yari Osorio, Socialism and Liberation
 James Harris / Alyson Kennedy, Socialist Workers
 Ross Carl "Rocky" Anderson / Luis Javier Rodriguez, Justice

Results

Results by county

Counties that flipped from Democratic to Republican

 Klickitat (largest city: Goldendale)
 Skamania (largest community: Carson)
 Wahkhiakum (largest community: Puget Island)
 Whitman (largest city: Pulman)

Results by congressional district
President Obama won 7 of 10 congressional districts, including the 8th district, which simultaneously elected a Republican (Dave Reichert) to the House of Representatives. Obama's best performance was in the 7th district, which encompasses most of Seattle and Burien, where he received 79.2% of the vote to Romney's 18.1%. Romney won the 3rd district, located in Southwestern Washington, by a 1.7% margin, as well as the 4th and 5th districts, both of which are located in the rural and conservative parts of Washington east of the Cascade Mountains.

See also
 United States presidential elections in Washington (state)
 2012 Democratic Party presidential primaries
 2012 Republican Party presidential primaries
 Results of the 2012 Republican Party presidential primaries
 2012 Republican Party presidential debates and forums

Notes

References

External links
The Green Papers: for Washington
The Green Papers: Major state elections in chronological order

2012
United States President
Washington